Little Women is a 1958 British television serial based on the 1868-69 two-volume novel of the same name by Louisa May Alcott. Aired on the BBC, it consisted of six episodes.

Cast 
Cast included Phyllis Calvert, Kate Cameron, Andrée Melly, Diana Day, Sylvia Davies, David Cole, Aithna Gover, Noel Howlett and Anne Iddon. Unlike many BBC series of the 1950s, the episodes still exist.

References

External links
Little Women at IMDb

1958 British television series debuts
1958 British television series endings
1950s British drama television series
Black-and-white British television shows
English-language television shows
BBC television dramas
1950s British television miniseries
Television series about the American Civil War
Television series based on Little Women